Sven Eric Emanuel Johanson (10 December 1919 - 29 September 1997) was a Swedish composer and organist.

Biography

Sven-Eric Johanson was born to Hjalmar and Beda Johanson in Västervik in 1919. The parents were both officers in the Salvation Army, but in 1926 Hjalmar became a pastor in Missionsförbundet instead. He began his formal music studies in 1938 at the Ingesund College of Music and was accepted to the Royal College of Music, Stockholm in 1939.

During his time as a student in Stockholm, Johanson studied composition with Melcher Melchers and organ with Otto Olsson and Alf Linder. In 1944 Johansson became the director of music at Uppsala Missionskyrka. In the 1940s Johanson studied Ernst Krenek's book on the  twelve-tone technique and employed it in his 1949 Sinfonia ostinata.

In 1952 he became the organist at Hagens kapell (today Älvsborgs kyrka) in Gothenborg, a position he held until 1977.

He was a founding member of The Monday Group. In 1971 he became a member of the Royal Swedish Academy of Music.

He is buried on the Stampen cemetery in Gothenburg.

Works
Johanson wrote twelve symphonies and several operas. He composed a number of concertos, som for unusual instruments like balalaika and nyckelharpa. He was a prolific composer of choir music.

He has written a hymn in the 1986 Swedish Hymnal, no. 214a, Lär mig att bedja av hjärtat.

Selected works

Works for orchestra and chamber ensemble
Sinfonia ostinata, symphony no. 1, 1949/54
Sinfonia elegiaca, symphony no. 2B, 1654-1955
Symfoni no. 3, 1956
Konsert för balalajka och stråkorkester, 1961
Variationer över en värmländsk orrlåt, 1963
Elementsymfonin (Etemenanki), symphony no. 5, 1965–68
Concerto Gotenburghese, piano concerto, 1970
Konsert för nyckelharpa och stråkorkester, 1971
Sinfonietta pastorella, symphony no. 6, 1972
Spelmanssymfoni för stråkorkester, symphony no. 7, 1974
En Frödingsymfoni för solister, kör och orkester, symphony no. 8, 1983–84
Sinfonia d'estate, symphony no. 9, 1987
Symphonie Chez nous, symphony no. 10, 1990
Sinfonia d'autunno, symphony no. 11, 1991
Sinfonia da camera, symphony no. 12, 1992

Operas
Petronella, "opera bluffa", 1942
Tjuvens pekfinger, opera buffa, 1966
Rivalerna, chamber opera, 1967
Sagan om ringen, opera, 1972, never performed
Reliken, opera, 1975
Skandal, Ers majestät, opera, 1978
Dinize, opera, 1993-94, never performed

Choral works
Psaltare och lyra (Snabbt jagar stormen våra år), (text Erik Axel Karlfeldt), 1953 
Symfoni nr 2A (Duinoelegi nr 7, text Rainer Maria Rilke), 1954
Fyra visor om årstiderna; Sommar-ro (Hedvig Charlotta Nordenflycht), Hösten (Jacob Wallenberg), Vintervisa (Anna Maria Lenngren), Vårvisa (Olof von Dalin), 1957
Sånger i förvandlingens natt, symfoni nr 4 (text Östen Sjöstrand), 1958
Fancies (text Shakespeare) för blandad kör och piano, 1974

Selected recordings

References

1919 births
1997 deaths
20th-century classical composers
Swedish classical composers
Swedish opera composers